Mountour can refer to:
The Mountour Ridge along the West Branch Susquehanna River.
Mountour County, Pennsylvania
Mountour Falls, New York